Fergana, or Ferghana, is a district-level city and the capital of Fergana Region in eastern Uzbekistan. Fergana is about 420 km east of Tashkent, about 75 km west of Andijan, and less than 20 km from the Kyrgyzstan border.

While the area has been populated for thousands of years, the modern city was founded in 1876.

History 

Fergana first appears in written records in the 5th-century. However, archeological evidence demonstrates that the city had been populated since the Chalcolithic period. Like many other Central Asian places in the sixth and seventh-centuries, Fergana was ruled by the Western Turkic Khaganate. Although it was still predominantly inhabited by eastern Iranians, many Turks had also started to settle there. The city of Fergana was refounded in 1876 as a garrison town and colonial appendage to Margilan ( to the northwest) by the Russian Empire.

It was initially named New Margelan, then renamed Skobelov in 1907 after the first Russian military governor of the Fergana Valley, Mikhail Skobelev. In 1924, after the Soviet Union's reconquest of the region from the Basmachi movement, the name was changed to Fergana, after the province of which it was the centre.

The industrial base of Fergana was developed in the 20th century. Industry in the city included textile manufacturing and a nitric fertiliser plant.  Some of the industrial development was a result of Evacuation in the Soviet Union during World War II.

Fergana has been a center for oil production in the Fergana Valley since the region's first oil refinery was built near the city in 1908. Since then, more refineries have been added, and Fergana is one of the most important centers of oil refining in Uzbekistan. Natural gas from western Uzbekistan is transported by pipeline to the valley, where it is used to manufacture fertilizer. The Great Fergana Canal, built almost entirely by hand during the 1930s, passes through the northern part of the city and was completed in 1939. During its construction, the canal and the city were widely photographed by the noted photographer Max Penson. With a western loan Fergana is able to modernize its refinery and also reduce air pollution emissions.

Climate
Fergana has a cool arid climate (Köppen BWk).

Demographics 
The population of Fergana city was approximately 299,200 as of 2022. Tajiks and Uzbeks are the largest ethnic groups, with Russian-speakers comprising about 25% of the city's population.

Culture

Architecture
Fergana has a high proportion of Russian, Soviet Koreans and Tatar inhabitants compared to other Fergana Valley cities. With its wide, tree-lined boulevards and Tsarist-era buildings, and Russian spoken frequently on the streets, the city has a distinctly different feel from the rest of the region.

Main sights 
 Museum of Local Studies – with displays of natural history, photographs, and local handicrafts
 Regional Theatre – in 1877 the house of General Mikhail “Old Bloody Eyes” Skobelev
Fergana State University - built in 1902

Notable people 
 Shamshad Abdullaev – author, poet
 Anastasiya Miroshnichenko – artistic gymnast
 Xudoyberdi To'xtaboyev – author
Ziroatkhon Hoshimova, First Lady of Uzbekistan
Peter Mikhailovich Kulakov, television evangelist
Ida Mayrin (born 1997), Israeli Olympic rhythmic gymnast
Yodgor Nasriddinova, Uzbek-Soviet engineer and communist party official
Abdulla Qahhor, Uzbek writer
Hamza Hakimzade Niyazi, Uzbek poet and playwright
Saida Mirziyoyeva, Uzbek politician, eldest daughter of the President of Uzbekistan
Furqat, Uzbek poet

Sports clubs 
 FC Neftchi Fergana
 FK Istiqlol Fergana

See also 
 Babur 
 FC Neftchi Fergana
 Nurkhon Yuldashkhojayeva

References
 Hill, John E. (2009) Through the Jade Gate to Rome: A Study of the Silk Routes during the Later Han Dynasty, 1st to 2nd Centuries CE. John E. Hill. BookSurge, Charleston, South Carolina. . 
 Watson, Burton. Trans. 1993. Records of the Grand Historian of China: Han Dynasty II. Translated from the Shiji of Sima Qian. Chapter 123: "The Account of Dayuan," Columbia University Press. Revised Edition. ;  (pbk.)
 Jean-Marie Thiébaud, Personnages marquants d'Asie centrale, du Turkestan et de l'Ouzbékistan, Paris, L'Harmattan, 2004. .

References

Sources

External links
 Official website 

Populated places in Fergana Region
Cities in Uzbekistan
Populated places along the Silk Road
Fergana Oblast